A Thousand Nights is the fourth studio album by Canadian singer-songwriter Melanie Doane. It was released on July 1, 2008 on her independent label, Prairie Ocean.

A Thousand Nights was re-released in 2009 after a limited copies release in 2008.

Track listing
 "Every Little Thing"
 "Songbird" featuring Jim Cuddy
 "Song of Bernadette"
 "First Love"
 "Wildflowers"
 "Devoted to You" featuring Ron Sexsmith
 "Chopin Ballad"
 "All The Diamonds" featuring Emilie-Claire Barlow and Kathryn Rose
 "Martha" featuring Ted Dykstra
 "Baby Makes Three"

References 

2008 albums
Melanie Doane albums